Linda Ichiyama is a Democratic member of the Hawaii State House of Representatives, representing Moanalua, Aliamanu and Salt Lake, Hawaii in the 32nd District since 2013.  Prior to this, Representative Ichiyama represented the same area when it was known as the 31st District since 2010.

Biography

Early life and education
Linda Ichiyama attended Salt Lake Elementary, Moanalua Middle School and Moanalua High School.  Linda received her bachelor's degree in international politics from Georgetown University and a law degree from the University of Hawaii at Manoa.

Legislative career
Representative Ichiyama currently serves as the vice chair of the Higher Education Committee and as a member of the Transportation, Education, Labor & Public Employment and Public Safety committees.

References

External links
Hawaii House of Representatives - Linda Ichiyama official government website
Project Vote Smart - Representative Linda Ichiyama (HI) profile

Women state legislators in Hawaii
Democratic Party members of the Hawaii House of Representatives
Living people
William S. Richardson School of Law alumni
People from Honolulu
Georgetown University alumni
21st-century American politicians
21st-century American women politicians
American women of Japanese descent in politics
Hawaii politicians of Japanese descent
Year of birth missing (living people)